Hlaing Bo Bo (born 8 July 1996) is a Burmese professional footballer who plays as a midfielder for Myanmar National League club Yangon United and the Myanmar national football team.

Club career 
Hlaing Bo Bo played with his club at the 2015 AFC Cup, where he scored twice as well as being yellow carded in a 4-7 loss to Pahang FA.

He joined Sukhothai on loan, failing to make a real impact during that time. He returned to Yadanarbon and eventually became captain for the rest of the 2022 Myanmar National League season, however he has received two red cards due to unprofessional behaviour towards referees.

After a disappointing 2022 season, Hlaing Bo Bo joined Yangon United. He stated that this may be his last club and might retire, focusing on a coaching career in the near future, after joining an interview with MNL.

International career

U-23 career 
Hlaing Bo Bo represented his country at the 2016 AFC U-23 Championship qualification, where in the first game against Chinese Taipei he scored twice in a 3-0 win. However, in the next match against Hong Kong Hlaing Bo Bo revived a red card and missed the rest of the qualifying games.

Hlaing Bo Bo also played at the 2015 Southeast Asian Games where he participated in every match as Myanmar made it to the final. He was also mentioned as one of Myanmar's top performers during the tournament.

Senior career 
He made his senior debut on 7 September 2015 in an exhibition match against New Zealand.

International goals
Scores and results list Myanmar's goal tally first.

Honours 
Individual
Sea games 2015 Silver 

AFF Championship Best Eleven: 2018

References 

1996 births
Living people
Burmese footballers
Myanmar international footballers
Yadanarbon F.C. players
Association football midfielders
Southeast Asian Games silver medalists for Myanmar
Southeast Asian Games medalists in football
Footballers at the 2018 Asian Games
Competitors at the 2015 Southeast Asian Games
Competitors at the 2017 Southeast Asian Games
Asian Games competitors for Myanmar
Competitors at the 2019 Southeast Asian Games
Southeast Asian Games bronze medalists for Myanmar